Andrew Mark Borodow (born September 16, 1969) is retired male wrestler from Canada. An Olympian, he won both the Maccabiah Games championship and the Commonwealth Games championship, and a silver medal in the Pan American Games. He was inducted into the Canada Wrestling Hall of Fame.

Biography

Borodow was born in Montreal, Quebec, Canada, and is Jewish. He lives in Willowdale, North York, Toronto, Ontario, Canada. He attended and competed for the College of William & Mary and Concordia University. He trained in wrestling under Victor Zilberman.

He won the Canadian Senior National Championship in Freestyle in 1988, 1989, 1990, 1993, 1994, and 1996. Borodow won the Canadian Senior National Championship in Greco-Roman in 1989, 1990, 1993, 1994, 1995, and 1996.

Borodow twice represented Canada at the Summer Olympics at 130 kg (Super-Heavyweight): in 1992 in Greco Roman (coming in 5th), and in 1996 in freestyle (coming in 14th).

At the 1989 Maccabiah Games in Israel, Borodow won two gold medals.  Borodow won two medals at the 1991 Pan American Games, a silver medal in freestyle and a bronze medal in Greco Roman.  He competed for Team Canada in the 1993 Maccabiah Games, again winning two gold medals, one in freestyle and one in Greco Roman.

Borodow won bronze medals at the 1993 and 1995 Sumo World Championships, and a silver medal in 1996.

He won two bronze medals at the 1995 Pan American Games, one each in freestyle and Greco Roman. Borodow won a gold medal at the 1994 Commonwealth Games in freestyle.

Borodow was inducted into the Canada Wrestling Hall of Fame in 2016.

See also
List of Commonwealth Games medallists in wrestling
List of Pan American Games medalists in wrestling

References

External links
 

1969 births
Living people
Canadian male sport wrestlers
Canadian sumo wrestlers
Commonwealth Games gold medallists for Canada
Commonwealth Games medallists in wrestling
Competitors at the 1989 Maccabiah Games
Competitors at the 1993 Maccabiah Games
Concordia Stingers players
Jewish Canadian sportspeople
Jewish wrestlers
Maccabiah Games gold medalists for Canada
Maccabiah Games medalists in wrestling
Medalists at the 1991 Pan American Games
Medalists at the 1995 Pan American Games
Olympic wrestlers of Canada
Pan American Games bronze medalists for Canada
Pan American Games medalists in wrestling
Pan American Games silver medalists for Canada
William & Mary Tribe wrestlers
Wrestlers at the 1991 Pan American Games
Wrestlers at the 1992 Summer Olympics
Wrestlers at the 1994 Commonwealth Games
Wrestlers at the 1995 Pan American Games
Wrestlers at the 1996 Summer Olympics
20th-century Canadian people
Medallists at the 1994 Commonwealth Games